Two-rooms-and-a-bath car is a type of tram or streetcar. The shortest examples consist of three sections. The sections at the ends each have two axles or four wheels. The centre section is suspended between the end sections, spanning like a bridge. The centre section has no wheels and appears to be floating or suspended.

History 

In 1892 a patent was registered by inventors Brewer and Krehbiel. The next year one piece was built for Cleveland. Only starting 1912, a series was built for Boston.

The first city in Europe to use this type of tram was Gothenburg: ten were used in service from 1922. Other cities followed but with only one or two pieces: Oslo (1924), Dresden and Leipzig (both in 1928), Amsterdam and Milan (both in 1932). In Milan and later also in other Italian cities several series were put into service. Whereas in the United States the high floor version was only built before the Second World War, it became a success in Europe and mostly in Germany.

Number of axles 
The ′classic trams/streetcars′ (with a regular high-floor and steps at the doors) came in at least three variants: the end sections can each be supported by two, three or four axles. The last variant was used twice in Düsseldorf during the 1960s.

The low-floor trams come in two variants: the end sections can each be supported by two or four axles. Most low-floor trams have more than three sections. Trams/streetcars with five sections —of which three with wheels and two sections floating— are most common. Though less widespread, this type can consist of seven or nine sections: nine section trams only run in Budapest and Dublin.

Gallery

See also 
 Articulated tram

References 

Tram vehicles